The House of Gattilusio was a powerful Genoese family who controlled a number of possessions in the northern Aegean from 1355 until the mid 15th century. Anthony Luttrell has pointed out that this family had developed close connections to the Byzantine ruling house of the Palaiologos—"four successive generations of Gattilusio married into the Palaiologos family, two to emperors' daughters, one to an emperor, and one to a despot who later became an emperor"—which could explain their repeated involvement in Byzantine affairs. The Gattilusi were Lords of Lesbos (present-day in Greece) from 1355 to 1462 and Lords of Aenus (present-day in Turkey) from 1376 to 1456.

History 

The Gattilusi family was founded by two brothers, Francesco and Niccolò Gattilusi, who were the nephew of Oberto Gattilusi. The name of their father is not known, although based on the heraldic evidence of their inscriptions, Anthony Luttrell argues that their mother was a member of the Doria family. Francesco gained the favor of Byzantine Emperor John V Palaiologos by helping him oust a rival to the throne, John VI Kantakouzenos, in 1354. As reward, Gattilusio was given lordship of the island of Lesbos (and its stronghold, Mytilene) from July 1355, as well as the hand in marriage of the emperor's sister, Maria. The Gattilusi possessions grew to include, among others, the islands of Imbros, Samothrace, Lemnos and Thasos, and the mainland city of Aenos (modern Enez in Turkey). From this position, they were heavily involved in the mining and marketing of alum, useful in textile production and a profitable trade controlled by the Genoese.

After the Fall of Constantinople in 1453, the Gattilusi briefly retained control of their possessions under Ottoman suzerainty, but were forced out within a few years. In 1456, the Ottomans appointed a native Greek historian, Michael Critobulus, as governor of Imbros, and likewise removed the Gattilusi from power in the remainder of their possessions, with the exception of Lesbos, which they were permitted to retain in return for an annual payment of 4,000 gold pieces. The lord of Lesbos, Domenico Gattilusio, was strangled and briefly succeeded by his brother Niccolò, before an Ottoman fleet captured the island in September 1462, sending Niccolò as prisoner to Constantinople (where he was later executed) and putting an end to the family's power.

Archaeological excavations in the castle of Mytilene since 1984 by the University of British Columbia under the direction of Caroline and Hector Williams have uncovered the burial chapel of the Gattilusi and a few graves that probably belonged to dependents of the family.  The building was converted into a mosque after the Ottoman capture of Mytilene in 1462; an earthquake in February 1867 destroyed it. The Canadian excavations have also added a considerable number of Gattilusi coins to the known corpus, now published by Dr. Robert Weir

Lords of Lesbos
 Francesco I Gattilusio (1355–1384)
 Francesco II Gattilusio (1384–1404)
 Jacopo Gattilusio (1404–1428)
 Dorino I Gattilusio (1428–1455)
 Domenico Gattilusio (1455–1458)
 Niccolò Gattilusio (1458–1462)

Lords of Aenus
 Niccolò Gattilusio (1376–1409)
 Palamede Gattilusio (1409–1455)
 Dorino II Gattilusio (1455–1456)

Notes

References

Further reading 
 
 Christopher Wright, The Gattilusio lordships and the Aegean world 1355-1462 (Leiden: Brill, 2014). 

Families of Genoa
14th century in Greece
15th century in Greece
 
Medieval Lesbos
Byzantine Empire–Republic of Genoa relations